Andrey Ponochevny (born 31 December 1976) is a Belarusian-American pianist.

Biography 
Ponochevny graduated from Belarusian Academy of Music where he received his bachelor's and master's degrees. He also holds his Artist Diploma from TCU, Fort Worth and SMU, Dallas, where he studied with Tamas Ungar and Joaquin Achucarro.

He was awarded the Bronze Medal at the XIII Tchaikovsky competition. Ponochevny has won First Prize at the "Tomassoni International Piano Competition in Cologne", Germany (1996) and the First Prize at the "William Kapell International Piano Competition in Maryland", USA (1998). His other competition accolades include top prizes in Prague, Warsaw (Chopin), Dublin (AXA), Moscow, Hong Kong, Riga (Latvia), Alexandria and New Orleans (Louisiana). He received an honorable mention at the XIII International Chopin Piano Competition.

Among his numerous awards, he was twice named "Outstanding Artist in China" (2009 and 2011). In his hometown of Minsk (Belarus), he was awarded the title "Minskovite of the year" in 2002.

In addition to his concert schedule, he also teaches piano at the University of Dallas in Irving, Texas. 

Ponochevny is a Yamaha Artist.

References
  2002 International Tchaikovsky Piano Competition Winners
  2010 New Orleans International Piano Competition Winners

External links
Website

1976 births
Living people
Musicians from Minsk
Belarusian classical pianists
Prize-winners of the International Chopin Piano Competition